Kaj Allan Olsen (born 10 February 1927) is a Danish former racing cyclist. He rode in the 1958 Tour de France. He also won the 1951 Peace Race.

Major results
1949
 3rd Overall Tour de Pologne
1st Stages 10 & 11
1951
 1st  Overall Peace Race
1st Stage 6
1956
 3rd Scheldeprijs

References

External links
 

1927 births
Possibly living people
Danish male cyclists
Cyclists from Copenhagen